Stenamma is a genus of cryptic leaf-litter ants that occurs in mesic forest habitats throughout the Holarctic region, Central America, and part of northwestern South America (Colombia and Ecuador).

Species
These 43 species belong to the genus Stenamma:

References

External links

Myrmicinae
Ant genera